is a Japanese actress and voice actress and former singer from Hyōgo Prefecture, Japan. She is affiliated with Amuse Inc. Tano was part of the girl group Boystyle from 2001 to 2007. Her voice acting career began with Toriko in 2011, and she has starred in several anime such as Smile PreCure, Francesca, Love Live! Sunshine!!, and Zombie Land Saga. She has also appeared in the theatrical productions of Persona 3: The Weird Masquerade, Persona 4 Arena, Blue Exorcist, Kuroko's Basketball, and The Seven Deadly Sins.

Biography
She was a originally a member of the idol group BOYSTYLE.

In 2011, her first anime role was in Toriko, voicing a character named Rin. In 2012, she voiced Akane Hino/Cure Sunny in Smile PreCure!, the ninth season of the Pretty Cure franchise;. In an interview two years later, Tano described it as the start of her voice acting career. In 2018, she reprised her Pretty Cure role alongside the other fifty-four Pretty Cures in the crossover film Hugtto! PreCure Futari wa Pretty Cure: All Stars Memories, which was certified as having the "Most Magical Warriors in an Anime Film" by Guinness World Records.

In January 2014, she starred as Mitsuru Kirijo in the stage musical Persona 3: The Weird Masquerade; she reprised the role in both the Persona 4 Arena stage play and Persona 4 Ultimax Song Project. On 3 April 2018, Tano was cast as Guila in the stage adaptation of The Seven Deadly Sins. On 28 July 2018, it was announced that Tano would cease performing at the stage production to recover from thyroid disease; the role of Guila was substituted by actress Haneyuri. She also played Mamushi Hojo in the stage adaptation of Blue Exorcist, Live Act Ao no Exorcist ~Mashin no Rakuin~, and Riko Aida in the stage adaptation of Kuroko's Basketball, Kuroko's Basketball The Encounter

In February 2014, she was cast as Exorcist in Francesca, an anime centered on the titular idol based in Hokkaido Prefecture, alongside the titular main character's voice actress Yui Makino. In April 2014, she was cast in Sega Hard Girls as Genesis. Her Sword Art Online II character Nori sang the song "Sleepless Legend" for the SAO II Song Collection, which was released on 22 March 2017. She voiced Sarah Kazuno in Love Live! Sunshine!!, who is part of the subunit duo Saint Snow alongside Leah Kazuno (voiced by Hinata Satō). She voices Aki Saotome in the third-person shooter video game Bullet Girls.

On 10 September 2018, Tano was cast as Saki Nikaido in Zombie Land Saga, an anime by Cygames and MAPPA. Tano was interviewed by Rolling Stone Japan alongside her co-stars Kaede Hondo, Minami Tanaka and Mamoru Miyano. She also appeared at the Zombie Land Saga panel at Crunchyroll Expo 2019. In her July 2019 interview with Anime! Anime! following the anime's collaboration with Grimoire A: Shiritsu Grimoire Mahou Gakuen, Tano mentioned that, during recording, she was given assistance to use the Saga dialect to reprise her character.

On 13 December 2021, she announced her marriage to Ryo Kitamura. On 12 December 2022, she announced the birth of her first child

Filmography

Anime

Film

Theatre

Video games

Dubbing

References

External links
Official agency profile 

1987 births
Living people
Amuse Inc. talents
Japanese idols
Japanese stage actresses
Japanese video game actresses
Japanese voice actresses
Saint Snow members
Voice actresses from Hyōgo Prefecture
21st-century Japanese actresses
21st-century Japanese women singers
21st-century Japanese singers